Jet Falcon may refer to:

 the "Zoid" from Zoids, see List of Zoids
 the jet aircraft both known as the Falcon
 Dassault Falcon
 F-16 Fighting Falcon